Matt S. Jones (born August 8, 1983) is an American former professional ice hockey defenseman who played in the National Hockey League (NHL) for the Phoenix Coyotes.

Playing career
Jones was selected 80th overall in the 2002 NHL Entry Draft by the Phoenix Coyotes. He played four seasons at the University of North Dakota and helped lead his team to the 2005 NCAA Frozen Four championship game as an assistant captain.

Jones made his professional debut in the 2005–06 season with the San Antonio Rampage of the American Hockey League (AHL). Jones made his National Hockey League (NHL) debut in the same year, playing in 16 games with the Coyotes.

On March 3, 2010, Jones was traded to the Toronto Maple Leafs, along with a 4th-round pick and a 7th-round pick in the 2010 NHL Entry Draft for Lee Stempniak. On April 27, 2010, it was revealed that Jones was still recovering from a concussion and was not medically cleared to play.

Career statistics

Regular season and playoffs

International

Awards and honors

References

External links

1983 births
American men's ice hockey defensemen
Green Bay Gamblers players
Living people
North Dakota Fighting Hawks men's ice hockey players
People from Downers Grove, Illinois
Arizona Coyotes draft picks
Phoenix Coyotes players
San Antonio Rampage players
Ice hockey players from Illinois